During the 1995–96 English football season, Derby County F.C. competed in the Football League First Division.

Season summary
Jim Smith became the new manager of Derby County in the summer, replacing former boss Roy McFarland. Although the new season started slowly, the signing of sweeper Igor Štimac in the early autumn proved pivotal. Throwing his brief of "a top-half finish" out the window, Smith guided the Rams to a second-place finish and promotion to the Premier League.

Final league table

Results
Derby County's score comes first

Legend

Football League First Division

Results per matchday

FA Cup

League Cup

Players

First-team squad
The following players all appeared for the first team this season.

Reserve team
The following players did not appear for the first team this season.

References

Notes

Derby County F.C. seasons
Derby County